The following is a list of Major League Baseball players, retired or active.

Li through Lz

References

External links
Last Names starting with L – Baseball-Reference.com

 Li-Lz